Edward A. Wiggins (March 13, 1933 – March 9, 2015) was a Democratic member of the Pennsylvania House of Representatives.
 He died in 2015 of heart failure.

References

Democratic Party members of the Pennsylvania House of Representatives
1933 births
2015 deaths
Politicians from Philadelphia